Braeside Halt (Manx: Stadd Braeside) is a stopping place on the Manx Electric Railway on the Isle of Man and is located on the first section of the inter-urban line a short distance from its southernmost terminus.

Origins
This halt can be located a short distance from the previous halt, being a simple wayside halt there are no facilities for waiting passengers, the only evidence of such a halt existing being the "Request Stop" signage, latterly replaced by modern bus stop signage during management policy changes that took effect during 1999 at which point a modern bus-type shelter was also erected on the site.  The tram stop sign is located not affixed to the shelter but atop a nearby traction pole.

Route

See also
 Manx Electric Railway Stations
 Onchan

References

Sources
Manx Electric Railway Stopping Places (2002) Manx Electric Railway Society
Island Images: Manx Electric Railway Pages (2003) Jon Wornham
Official Tourist Department Page (2009) Isle of Man Heritage Railways

Railway stations in the Isle of Man
Manx Electric Railway
Railway stations opened in 1893